Lars Højer Nielsen (born 8 December 1970) is a Danish former professional footballer who played as a midfielder. He made 166 appearances for Copenhagen in the Danish Superliga from 1992 to 1999. His son Casper Højer Nielsen is also a professional footballer.

Højer was known as a free kick specialist.

Previously he led BK Skjold's team from the fourth best Danish league to the second tier as a playing coach. He has also coached the club's women's team.

Højer is currently the head of scouting for Copenhagen.

Honours
Copenhagen
 Danish Superliga: 1992–93
 Danish Cup : 1994–95, 1996–97

Individual
 Copenhagen Player of the Year: 1994

External links
F.C. Copenhagen stats
National team profile

1970 births
Living people
Danish men's footballers
Olympic footballers of Denmark
Footballers at the 1992 Summer Olympics
BK Skjold players
F.C. Copenhagen players
Danish Superliga players
Danish football managers
F.C. Copenhagen non-playing staff
Denmark international footballers
Denmark under-21 international footballers
Association football midfielders
Footballers from Copenhagen